Nocardioides ginkgobilobae is a Gram-positive and aerobic bacterium from the genus Nocardioides which has been isolated from the roots of the tree Ginkgo biloba from Dandong, China.

References 

 

ginkgobilobae
Bacteria described in 2016